East Caln Township is a township in Chester County, Pennsylvania, United States. The population was 5,380 at the 2020 census.  The township wraps around the east half of Downingtown and is mostly indistinguishable from it.  East Caln Township is very developed, containing several shopping centers, including the regionally important Brandywine Square Center, several recently constructed housing developments varying from condominiums to large single family homes, and some industry in the southern fringe of the township.

Geography

Adjacent townships
Caln Township (northwestern boundary)
East Brandywine Township (north)
Uwchlan Township (northwest)
West Whiteland Township (east)
East Bradford Township (southwest)
West Bradford Township (south)

East Caln Township surrounds the borough of Downingtown on the north, east, and south sides.

Demographics

At the 2010 census, the township was 72.1% non-Hispanic White, 6.1% Black or African American, 0.2% Native American, 17.0% Asian, and 2.3% were two or more races. 2.8% of the population were of Hispanic or Latino ancestry.

As of the census of 2000, there were 2,857 people, 1,205 households, and 771 families residing in the township.  The population density was 786.6 people per square mile (303.9/km2).  There were 1,276 housing units at an average density of 351.3/sq mi (135.7/km2).  The racial makeup of the township was 87.75% White, 6.16% African American, 0.35% Native American, 4.03% Asian, 0.04% Pacific Islander, 0.18% from other races, and 1.51% from two or more races. Hispanic or Latino of any race were 1.89% of the population.

There were 1,205 households, out of which 30.1% had children under the age of 18 living with them, 51.8% were married couples living together, 8.1% had a female householder with no husband present, and 36.0% were non-families. 29.5% of all households were made up of individuals, and 7.9% had someone living alone who was 65 years of age or older.  The average household size was 2.35 and the average family size was 2.96.

In the township the population was spread out, with 23.7% under the age of 18, 6.5% from 18 to 24, 33.7% from 25 to 44, 24.7% from 45 to 64, and 11.3% who were 65 years of age or older.  The median age was 37 years. For every 100 females there were 100.1 males.  For every 100 females age 18 and over, there were 94.9 males.

The median income for a household in the township was $65,000, and the median income for a family was $78,108. Males had a median income of $52,344 versus $35,329 for females. The per capita income for the township was $33,430.  About 2.0% of families and 3.2% of the population were below the poverty line, including 1.7% of those under age 18 and 1.2% of those age 65 or over.

Education

School age students residing in East Caln Township attend schools in the Downingtown Area School District. There are no public schools located within the boundaries of the township.

Residents are within the Beaver Creek, East Ward, or Uwchlan Hills elementary boundaries. The township is divided into two secondary boundaries: Downingtown Middle School and Downingtown West High School, and Lionville Middle School and Downingtown East High School.

Governance
East Caln Township is designated by the Commonwealth of Pennsylvania as a township of the second class, and is governed by a three-member Board of Supervisors.  The day-to-day operations of the township are managed by the Township Manager.

Public safety
Police services in East Caln Township are provided by the Downingtown Police Department under a contract that was initiated in 2005.  Fire and emergency medical services are provided by the Downingtown Fire Department.

Transportation

U.S. Route 30 is the main highway serving East Caln Township. It follows the Coatesville-Downingtown Bypass and the Exton Bypass along an east-west alignment across the northern portion of the township. U.S. Route 30 Business follows the old route of US 30 along Lancaster Avenue on an east-west alignment through the central portion of the township. U.S. Route 322 follows Brandywine Avenue along a northwest-southeast alignment through the southwestern corner of the township. Pennsylvania Route 113 follows Uwchlan Avenue along a northeast-southwest alignment through the northern portion of the township. Finally, Pennsylvania Route 282 follows Creek Road on a north-south alignment through the western tip of the township.

References

External links

 East Caln Township

Townships in Chester County, Pennsylvania